UCLPartners is an academic health science centre located in London, England. It is the largest academic health science centre in the world, treats more than 1.5 million patients each year, has a combined annual turnover of around £2 billion and includes around 3,500 scientists, senior researchers and consultants.

The members of UCLPartners include Barts Health NHS Trust, Great Ormond Street Hospital for Children NHS Trust, Moorfields Eye Hospital NHS Foundation Trust, Queen Mary University of London, Royal Free London NHS Foundation Trust, University College London (UCL), The Tavistock and Portman NHS Foundation Trust and University College London Hospitals NHS Foundation Trust.

History

In July 2007 the then Health Minister Lord Darzi recommended the establishment of a number of academic health science centres in the UK.

Great Ormond Street Hospital for Children NHS Trust, Moorfields Eye Hospital NHS Foundation Trust, Royal Free Hampstead NHS Trust (now Royal Free London NHS Foundation Trust), UCL and University College London Hospitals NHS Foundation Trust announced their intention to form UCLPartners in August 2008. In February 2009 Professor Sir Cyril Chantler was appointed as the first Chair of UCLPartners and it was officially designated as one of the UK's first academic health science centres by the UK Department of Health in March 2009.

Key strategic appointments were made in summer 2009, including Professor David Fish as Managing Director and seven Programme Directors. An alliance between UCL, UCLPartners, Yale University and Yale-New Haven Hospital was announced in October 2009. The UCLPartners academic strategy and key research priorities were agreed in November 2009. In October 2011 it was announced that Barts and The London NHS Trust and Queen Mary, University of London had agreed to join UCLPartners, making it the largest academic health science centre in the world.

Barking, Havering and Redbridge University Hospitals NHS Trust agreed to join UCLPartners in April 2012.

In May 2013 UCLPartners was officially designated as one of 15 Academic Health Science Networks established by the NHS in England.

In April 2014 UCLPartners established MedCity, an initiative to develop the life sciences cluster in London and the wider "golden triangle", in partnership with the Mayor of London, King's Health Partners, Imperial College Academic Health Science Centre and the Universities of Cambridge and Oxford.

Organisation
The governing body of UCLPartners is UCLPartners Ltd, a company limited by guarantee. The governance arrangements consist of:

 A board led by an independent chair;
 An executive group comprising the four chief executives of the four NHS Trusts, the UCL Vice-Provost (health), the UCL Research Dean and the Managing Director of UCLPartners;
 Internationally renowned clinical academics to direct programmes for research, service delivery and education.

Research

According to the independent Thomson ISI Essential Science Indicators, which assesses organisations according to the number of highly cited publications produced, UCLPartners is ranked: first in the world for research into ophthalmology; second in the world (and first in Europe) for neuroscience; first in Europe for clinical medicine; and second in Europe for immunology.

UCLPartners’ research priorities are divided into the following 11 key programme areas:

Infectious Diseases
Neurological Disorders
Eyes and Vision
Cardiovascular Health
Children's Health
Women's Health
Immunology and Transplantation
Cancer
Mental Health
Oral Health
Ear, nose and throat

See also
Healthcare in London
Genomics England
UCLH/UCL Biomedical Research Centre
Medical Research Council
Francis Crick Institute

References

External links
 

University College London
Academic health science centres
Health in London
Innovation in the United Kingdom
2009 establishments in England